The 2019–20 Biathlon World Cup – Stage 8 was the eighth event of the season and is held in Kontiolahti, Finland, from 12 to 14 March 2020. Originally, two relay races would have been held on March 15, but this was canceled due to the COVID-19 pandemic.

Schedule of events 
The events took place at the following times.

Medal winners

Men

Women

Mixed

References 

Biathlon World Cup - Stage 8, 2019-20
2019–20 Biathlon World Cup
Biathlon competitions in Finland
Biathlon World Cup